A kilogram-force per centimetre square (kgf/cm2), often just kilogram per square centimetre (kg/cm2), or kilopond per centimetre square is a deprecated unit of pressure using metric units. It is not a part of the International System of Units (SI), the modern metric system. 1 kgf/cm2 equals 98.0665 kPa (kilopascals). It is also known as a technical atmosphere (symbol: at).

The kilogram-force per square centimetre remains active as a measurement of force primarily due to older pressure measurement devices still in use.

This use of the unit of pressure provides an intuitive understanding for how a body's mass can apply force to a scale's surface area i.e.kilogram-force per square (centi-)metre. 

In SI units, the unit is converted to the SI derived unit pascal (Pa), which is defined as one newton per square metre (N/m2). A newton is equal to 1 kg⋅m/s2, and a kilogram-force is 9.80665 N, meaning that 1 kgf/cm2 equals 98.0665 kilopascals (kPa).

In some older publications, kilogram-force per square centimetre is abbreviated ksc instead of kg/cm2.

{|
|-
|valign=top rowspan=2|1 at ||= 98.0665 kPa
|-
|≈  standard atmospheres
|}

Ambiguity of at
The symbol "at" clashes with that of the katal (symbol: "kat"), the SI unit of catalytic activity; a kilotechnical atmosphere would have the symbol "kat", indistinguishable from the symbol for the katal.  It also clashes with that of the non-SI unit, the attotonne, but that unit would more likely be rendered as the equivalent SI unit, the picogram.

References

Units of pressure
Non-SI metric units